Callionymus brevianalis, the small ruddertail dragonet, is a species of dragonet native to the coastal waters of Indonesia where it can be found at depths of from . This species grows to a length of  standard length.

References

Callionymidae
Fish described in 1983